Reinhard Voigt (born 9 July 1940) is a German painter and ceramist.

Career 
After being trained as a ceramist, Voigt studied from 1965 to 1971 with Hans Thiemann, David Hockney and Gotthard Graubner, among others, at the Hochschule für bildende Künste Hamburg. After his studies, he had solo exhibitions at the Galerie M. E. Thelen in Cologne. Voigt was also featured in a solo presentation in the now legendary exhibition series "14 x 14" at the Kunsthalle Baden-Baden (1968-1973) alongside Palermo, Rainer Ruthenbeck, Georg Baselitz, Gerhard Richter and others of the then emerging generation of German painters. The painter emigrated to New York in 1978, moved to Los Angeles in 1985, and in 2000 moved to Upstate New York, where he remained until his return to Berlin in 2017. Voigt has always been faithful to the grid he developed in the academy as a basis and site for exploring the categories of form, abstraction, figuration, anonymity, ductus, color tonality, and ultimately beauty and legibility. The formal stringency of his approach has consequently led to describing his work as a negotiating space of the art-historically significant grid. It is in this context that his work was also exhibited in the 2012 exhibition "Rasterfahndung" alongside those of Roy Lichtenstein, Sigmar Polke, and others at the Kunstmuseum Stuttgart. Only recently has a reassessment taken place that also situates Voigt's lifelong work as a commentary on post-1945 German painting. Works by the artist are in the Bank of America Collection, London, the Eli Broad (Sun America Collection), Santa Monica, USA, the Kunstmuseum Stuttgart, the Collection of the State of Baden-Württemberg, the Städtische Galerie, Wolfsburg, the Museum of Modern Art, New York, and in numerous private collections. Reinhard Voigt was awarded a grant from the Stiftung Kunstfonds in 2021 for the cataloguing of his works. The artist lives and works in Berlin.

Exhibitions (selection)

Solo exhibitions 

 2021 Reinard Voigt: Hör zu, jevouspropose, Zurich
 2020 DATA siegt!, FELD+HAUS, Frankfurt am Main 
 2018 Unsere Welt – der andere Blick, FELD+HAUS, Frankfurt am Main
 2016 No Ideas But in Things, FELD+HAUS, Frankfurt am Main
 2013 High Resolution, FELD+HAUS, Frankfurt am Main
 2012 Ist der Mensch messbar, BQ Gallery, Berlin
 2009 BQ Gallery, Berlin
 2007 Kunstverein Gera, Gera
 2006 BQ Gallery, Cologne
 2003 BQ Gallery, Cologne
 1999 Zella Gallery, London
 1997 Gallery Gudrun Spielvogel, Munich
 1995 Wortmalerei, Merve Verlag, Berlin
 1993 In Memory Of Petra Kelly, Angles Gallery, Santa Monica, CA
 1991 Reinhard Voigt: A Survey, Angles Gallery, Santa Monica, CA
 1989 Decals, Komat Gallery, Braunschweig
 1989 One Plus One, Kunstverein Wolfenbüttel
 1989 Academy of Fine Arts, Braunschweig
 1974 Salon K. Wolf, Essen
 1973 Gallery M.E. Thelen, Köln
 1972 Kunstverein Unna, Unna
 1971 Gallery M.E. Thelen, Köln
 1970 Kunsthalle Baden-Baden, Baden-Baden

Group exhibitions 
 2022 Alpensinfonie. Hans Erni Museum, Lucerne
 2020 Good Vibrations. Sommer in der Pop-Art, Wilhelm-Hack-Museum, Ludwigshafen/Rhein
 2020 ZONA MACO, FELD+HAUS, Mexico City
 2019 ZONA MACO, FELD+HAUS, Mexico City
 2018 ARTBO, FELD+HAUS, Bogota
 2014 Frieze Art Fair, BQ Gallery, London
 2013 Ed Ruscha Books & Co, Museum Brandhorst, Munich
 2013 Ed Rusha Books & Co, Gagosian Gallery, New York
 2013 „Gut Aufgelegt“, Sammlung H. Beck, Ludwigshafen/Rhein
 2012 „Rasterfahndung“, Kunstmuseum Stuttgart, Stuttgart
 2012 „Paul Thek, in Process“, Lehmbruck Museum, Duisburg
 2010 „A Moving Plan B – Chapter One“, Drawing Room, London
 2008 Frieze Art Fair, BQ Gallery, London
 2006 Art Basel, BQ Gallery, Basel
 2005 „Jahresgaben 05“, Kunstverein Köln, Cologne
 2003 Kunsthalle Düsseldorf, Düsseldorf
 2003 Frieze Art Fair, BQ Gallery, London
 2002 Galerie vom Zufall und vom Glück, Hannover
 1998 „The Table“, Sprengel Museum, Hannover
 1986 „Meisterwerke der städtischen Galerie Wolfsburg“, Sarajevo
 1979 Mathildenhöhe, Darmstadt
 1978 Alex Rosenberg Gallery, New York
 1974 „Junge Deutsche Kunst“, Gallery Ginza Five, Tokyo
 1973 Galerie Rudolf Zwirner, Cologne
 1973 Galerie H. Neuendorf, Hamburg/Cologne

References 

1940 births
21st-century German painters
21st-century German male artists
German ceramists
Artists from Berlin
20th-century German painters
20th-century German male artists
German male painters
University of Fine Arts of Hamburg alumni
Living people